The Serbia men's national under-18 basketball team is the boys' basketball team, administered by Basketball Federation of Serbia, that represents Serbia in international under-18 (under age 18) men's basketball competitions, consisting mainly of the FIBA Europe Under-18 Championship. The event was originally referred to as the European Championship for Juniors.

The national team played as FR Yugoslavia from 1993 to 2003, and as Serbia and Montenegro from 2004 to 2006.

History

1992–2006: Serbia and Montenegro

2007 onwards: Serbia

Individual awards 

 Most Valuable Player
 Dragan Labović – 2005
 Nikola Mišković – 2017
 Marko Pecarski – 2018
 All-Tournament Team
 Dejan Musli – 2009
 Nikola Silađi – 2010
  Nenad Miljenović – 2011
 Vasilije Micić – 2011
 Nikola Janković – 2012
 Nikola Radičević – 2012
 Stefan Lazarević – 2014
 Nikola Mišković – 2017
 Marko Pecarski – 2018
 Filip Petrušev – 2018
 Ilija Milijašević – 2022

 Statistical leaders: Points
 Vladimir Vidačić – 1996
 Marko Pecarski – 2018
 Statistical leaders: Rebounds
 Marko Pecarski – 2018
 Statistical leaders: Assists
 Vojislav Stojanović – 2015

Competitive record

Representing FR Yugoslavia / Serbia and Montenegro

Representing Serbia

Coaches

FR Yugoslavia / Serbia and Montenegro

Serbia

Past rosters

Representing FY Yugoslavia / Serbia and Montenegro

Representing Serbia

See also 
 Serbia men's national under-18 3x3 team
 Serbian men's university basketball team
 Serbia men's national under-20 basketball team
 Serbia men's national under-19 basketball team
 Serbia men's national under-17 basketball team
 Serbia men's national under-16 basketball team

Notes

References

External links
 Basketball Federation of Serbia
 FIBA Europe

M U18
Men's national under-18 basketball teams